The Northland is an area on the northside of the Kansas City metropolitan area comprising Platte County and Clay County. Just north of the Missouri River, the Northland includes the northern part of Kansas City, Missouri, the cities of North Kansas City, Liberty, Platte City, and Gladstone, and the towns of Smithville and Pleasant Valley. The area is home to more than 360,000 people.

The Northland is largely suburban and rural compared to the rest of the Kansas City metro area, but it has been rapidly developing within the last decade.

Notable Businesses and Attractions
 Briarcliff Village
 Charles B. Wheeler Downtown Airport
 Kansas City International Airport
 North Kansas City Hospital
 Oceans of Fun
 Shoal Creek Living History Museum 
 Weston
 William Jewell College
 Worlds of Fun
 Zona Rosa

References 

Neighborhoods in Kansas City, Missouri